I riti d'Efeso is a dramma eroico per musica or opera in 2 acts and 26 scenes by composer Giuseppe Farinelli. The work uses an Italian language libretto by Gaetano Rossi. The work premiered at La Fenice in Venice on 26 December 1803 in a double bill with Filippo Beretti's Atamaro e Obeide.

Roles

References

Operas
1803 operas
Italian-language operas
Operas by Giuseppe Farinelli
Opera world premieres at La Fenice
Libretti by Gaetano Rossi